Michelle Gulyás (born 24 October 2000) is a Hungarian modern pentathlete. She won the silver medal in the women's individual event at the 2022 World Modern Pentathlon Championships held in Alexandria, Egypt.

She participated at the 2018 World Modern Pentathlon Championships, winning a silver medal in the mixed relay.

At the 2021 World Modern Pentathlon Championships, she won two medals, one bronze in the individual, and one silver in the team competition.

References

External links

Living people
2000 births
Hungarian female modern pentathletes
World Modern Pentathlon Championships medalists
Modern pentathletes at the 2018 Summer Youth Olympics
Modern pentathletes at the 2020 Summer Olympics
21st-century Hungarian women